Miroslav Kopal (born January 17, 1963) was a Czechoslovakian-Czech nordic combined skier who competed from 1984 to 1996. At the 1988 Winter Olympics in Calgary, he finished sixth in the 3 × 10 km and seventh in the 15 km individual events. He also competed in the 1994 Winter Olympics.

Kopal's best individual finish at the FIS Nordic World Ski Championships was fifth in the 15 kn individual at Lahti in 1989. His best World Cup finish was fourth twice both in 15 km individual events in 1988.

References

External links

Nordic combined skiers at the 1988 Winter Olympics
Czech male Nordic combined skiers
Czechoslovak male Nordic combined skiers
Living people
1963 births
Czech male skiers
Czechoslovak male skiers
Nordic combined skiers at the 1994 Winter Olympics